The 1985 NCAA Division I Cross Country Championships were the 47th annual NCAA Men's Division I Cross Country Championship and the 5th annual NCAA Women's Division I Cross Country Championship to determine the team and individual national champions of NCAA Division I men's and women's collegiate cross country running in the United States. In all, four different titles were contested: men's and women's individual and team championships.

Held on November 25, 1985, the combined meet was hosted by Marquette University in Milwaukee, Wisconsin. The distance for the men's race was 10 kilometers (6.21 miles) while the distance for the women's race was 5 kilometers (3.11 miles).

The men's team national championship was won by Wisconsin, their second national title. The individual championship was won by Tim Hacker, from Wisconsin, with a time of 29:17.88.

The women's team national championship was also won by Wisconsin, their second national title. The individual championship was won by Suzie Tuffey, from NC State, with a time of 16:22.53.

Qualification
All Division I cross country teams were eligible to qualify for the meet through their placement at various regional qualifying meets. In total, 22 teams and 181 runners contested the men's championship while 16 teams and 129 runners contested the women's title.

Men's title
Distance: 10,000 meters (6.21 miles)

Men's Team Result (Top 10)

Men's Individual Result (Top 10)

Women's title
Distance: 5,000 meters (3.11 miles)

Women's Team Result (Top 10)

Women's Individual Result (Top 10)

See also
NCAA Men's Cross Country Championships (Division II, Division III)
NCAA Women's Cross Country Championships (Division II, Division III)

References
 

NCAA Cross Country Championships
NCAA Division I Cross Country Championships
NCAA Division I Cross Country Championships
Sports competitions in Milwaukee
1980s in Milwaukee
November 1985 sports events in the United States
Track and field in Wisconsin
Marquette University